Meysam Hosseini (June 7, 1987) is an Iranian professional footballer who plays as a defender for Siah Jamegan in the Persian Gulf League. He usually plays as a left back.

Hosseini was born in the city of Nowshahr and played youth football with local club Shamoushak before moving to Gostaresh in 2009. He moved to Tehran-based club Esteghlal in 2011, where he won the Hazfi Cup, until joining Naft Tehran. Hosseini joined Persepolis on a two-year contract in 2013 and signed for Siah Jamegan Khorasan F.C. in 2015 after his contract expired.

Club career

Shamoushak
In 2006, Hosseini started his career with Shamoushak at youth levels.

Gostaresh
After three seasons with Shamoushak, he joined Gostaresh in summer 2009. He helped Gostaresh reach the 2010 Hazfi Cup Final.

Esteghlal
After good performances in the Azadegan League and Hazfi Cup matches, he joined Persian Gulf League side Esteghlal with a two-year contract. He helped the club win the Hazfi Cup during his first season. In his second season, he was mostly benched and moved to Naft Tehran during the winter transfer window.

Naft Tehran
On 29 December 2012, he moved to Naft Tehran as part of Iman Mousavi deal. He played in 15 matches and received two yellow cards.

Persepolis
He signed a two-years contract with Persepolis on 3 June 2013.

Siah Jamegan
Following the expiration of his contract, Hosseini joined recently promoted club Siah Jamegan in 2015.

Club career statistics

 Assist Goals

Honours

Club
Gostaresh Foolad
Hazfi Cup runner-up: 2009–10

Esteghlal
Hazfi Cup: 2011–12

Persepolis
Iran Pro League runner-up: 2013–14

References

External links
 Meysam Hosseini at Persian League
Meysam Hosseini at ffiri.ir

1987 births
Living people
Iranian footballers
Shamoushak Noshahr players
Gostaresh Foulad F.C. players
Esteghlal F.C. players
Naft Tehran F.C. players
Persepolis F.C. players
Siah Jamegan players
Persian Gulf Pro League players
Azadegan League players
Association football fullbacks
People from Nowshahr
Sportspeople from Mazandaran province